This is a list of notable sketch comedy television series by country.

Australia 

 Aunty Donna's Big Ol' House of Fun
 Australia You're Standing In It
 BackBerner
 Big Bite
 Big Girl's Blouse
 Black Comedy
 The Comedy Company
 Comedy Inc.
 The D-Generation
 Fast Forward
 Full Frontal
 Just for Laughs
 The Late Show
 Let Loose Live
 The Mavis Bramston Show
 The Micallef P(r)ogram(me)
 The Naked Vicar Show
 Open Slather
 The Paul Hogan Show
 Real Stories
 The Ronnie Johns Half Hour
 SkitHOUSE
 The Wedge
 The Russell Gilbert Show
 We Interrupt This Broadcast
 You're Skitting Me

Belgium 
 Schalkse Ruiters
 In de gloria

Brazil 
 Hermes & Renato
 TV Pirata
 Pânico na TV
 Show do Tom
 Zorra Total
 A Praça É Nossa
 CQC
 Porta dos Fundos

Canada 

 Air Farce
 Alan Hamel's Comedy Bag
 Baroness von Sketch Show
 The Beaverton
 Bizarre
 The Bobroom
 Brothers TV
 Buzz
 Bye Bye
 Caution: May Contain Nuts
 Charlie Had One But He Didn't Like It, So He Gave It To Us
 CODCO
 Comedy Inc.
 Double Exposure
 La Fin du monde est à 7 heures
 Four on the Floor
 Le Fric Show
 Funny Farm
 The Gavin Crawford Show
 The Hart and Lorne Terrific Hour
 The Hilarious House of Frightenstein
 History Bites
 The Holmes Show
 Hotbox
 House of Venus Show
 Howie Mandel's Sunny Skies
 HumanTown
 It's Only Rock & Roll
 Just for Laughs
 The Kids in the Hall
 LoadingReadyRun
 The Morgan Waters Show
 Le nouveau show
 Picnicface
 Point Blank
 Qanurli
 The Red Green Show
 Rick Mercer Report
 Rock et Belles Oreilles
 The Ron James Show
 The S and M Comic Book
 Samedi de rire
 The Second City Project
 Second City Television
 SketchCom
 Smith & Smith / The Comedy Mill
 SNL Québec
 Sons of Butcher
 Sunnyside
 Super Dave
 System Crash
 TallBoyz
 That's So Weird!
 This Hour Has 22 Minutes
 Tiny Plastic Men
 The Tom Green Show
 Truthhorse
 The Vacant Lot
 The Vent!
 Wayne and Shuster
 Y B Normal?
 You Can't Do That on Television
 Zut!

Finland 
 Pulttibois

Indonesia 
 Extravaganza

India 
 The Viral Fever

Republic of Ireland 
 Bull Island
 Dave Allen at Large / The Dave Allen Show

Malaysia 
 Senario

The Netherlands 
 Jiskefet
 Van Kooten en De Bie
 Draadstaal
 De TV Kantine
 Koefnoen

New Zealand 
 Pulp Sport
 Back of the Y

Norway 
 Team Antonsen
 Tre brødre som ikke er brødre
 Uti vår hage

Philippines 
 Goin' Bulilit
 Banana Sundae
 Bubble Gang
 Lokomoko
 Wow Mali

Singapore 
 Just for Laughs Gags Asia

United Kingdom 

 2DTV
 3 Non-Blondes
 The 11 O'Clock Show
 Aaagh! It's the Mr. Hell Show!
 A Bit of Fry & Laurie
 Absolutely
 The Adam and Joe Show
 Alas Smith and Jones
 Al Murray's Multiple Personality Disorder
 Alexei Sayle's Merry-Go-Round
 Alexei Sayle's Stuff
 Alfresco
 The All New Alexei Sayle Show
 And There's More
 Anna & Katy
 The Armando Iannucci Shows
 Armstrong and Miller                                     
 The Armstrong & Miller Show
 At Last the 1948 Show
 Balls of Steel                                                  
 Bang, Bang, It's Reeves and Mortimer
 Barking
 Barry Welsh Is Coming
 Bellamy's People
 The Benny Hill Show
 Before the Fringe
 Bellamy's People
 Beyond a Joke
 The Big Impression
 Big Train
 A Bit of Fry & Laurie
 Blunder
 Bo' Selecta!'
 Brass Eye Bremner, Bird and Fortune Broaden Your Mind Bruiser Burnistoun The Cannon and Ball Show Cardinal Burns The Catherine Tate Show The Charlie Drake Show Chewin' the Fat Come Fly with Me Comedy Nation The Comic Side of 7 Days The Complete and Utter History of Britain Cool It Copy Cats The Day Today Dead Ringers                                            
 The Dick Emery Show Do Not Adjust Your Set Dogface Drake's Progress End of Part One Famalam The Fast Show                                                         
 Fist of Fun        
 Fool Britannia Frankie Boyle's Tramadol Nights French and Saunders                                             
 The Frost Report Goodbye Again Goodness Gracious Me                              
 Hale and Pace                                                               
 Harry & Paul Harry Enfield & Chums Harry Enfield's Brand Spanking New Show Headcases Hello Cheeky (radio and television)
 High Spirits with Shirley Ghostman The History of the World Backwards Horne & Corden Horrible Histories (2009)  Horrible Histories (2015) The Illustrated Weekly Hudd The Imaginatively-Titled Punt & Dennis Show The Impressions Show with Culshaw and Stephenson Inside Victor Lewis-Smith Is It Bill Bailey? It's a Square World It's Kevin It's Marty Jam Jeff Global's Global Probe Julie Walters and Friends Just for Laughs The Karen Dunbar Show Katy Brand's Big Ass Show The Keith & Paddy Picture Show The Keith Lemon Sketch Show The Kenny Everett Video Show The Kenny Everett Television Show The Kevin Bishop Show A Kick Up the Eighties Kookyville KYTV La La Land Laugh??? I Nearly Paid My Licence Fee The Laughter Show Lenny Henry in Pieces                                            
 The Lenny Henry Show Lee Nelson's Well Funny People Lee Nelson's Well Good Show                                
 Limmy's Show The Little and Large Show Little Britain Little Miss Jocelyn Man Stroke Woman Marc Wootton Exposed Marty 
 The Marty Feldman Comedy Machine The Mary Whitehouse Experience Mash and Peas The Message Modern Toss Monkey Dust Monkey Trousers Monty Python's Flying Circus Morecambe & Wise The Morgana Show Naked Video                                                         
 Newman and Baddiel in Pieces Newzoids No Signal! Noel Fielding's Luxury Comedy Not Only... But Also Not the Nine O'Clock News On the Margin The One... Paul Merton: The Series The Peter Serafinowicz Show Planet Sketch Psychobitches Q... The Real McCoy The Revolution Will Be Televised Ronni Ancona & Co Running Wild Rush Hour The Russ Abbot Show Rutland Weekend Television The Saturday Night Armistice Saturday Stayback Scallywagga School of Comedy Scotch and Wry Set of Six Sez Les The Sketch Show A Show Called Fred Slapstick and Old Lace Smack the Pony                                          
 The Smell of Reeves and Mortimer Son of Fred Sorry, I've Got No Head Spitting Image Spoons Star Stories The Summer Show That Mitchell and Webb Look The Mitchell and Webb Situation That Was the Week That Was This Morning with Richard Not Judy Three of a Kind Time Trumpet Tittybangbang                                                            
 The Tony Hancock Show Touch Me, I'm Karen Taylor Tracey Breaks the News Tracey Ullman's Show Trigger Happy TV Twice a Fortnight The Two Ronnies Unnatural Acts Up Sunday Very Important People Vic Reeves Big Night Out Victoria Wood as Seen on TV Walk on the Wild Side Walliams & Friend Watson & Oliver Whatever I Want Where Was Spring? Who Dares Wins Wood and Walters World Shut Your Mouth The Wrong Door United States 

 The ½ Hour News Hour 50 Central The ABC Comedy Hour Acceptable.TV Adam Ruins Everything ADHD Shorts The Alan Young Show The All-New Mickey Mouse Club (MMC) All That Almost Live! Alternatino with Arturo Castro The Amanda Show The Amber Ruffin Show The Andy Dick Show The Andy Milonakis Show Animaniacs (1993)
 Animaniacs (2020)
 The Apollo Comedy Hour The Aquabats! Super Show! Assaulted Nuts Astronomy Club: The Sketch Show At Home with Amy Sedaris Atom TV Aunty Donna's Big Ol' House of Fun AwesomenessTV The B.S. of A. with Brian Sack Beakman's World The Ben Show The Ben Stiller Show Between the Lions Beyond Our Control Big Bag Big Chuck and Lil' John The Big Gay Sketch Show Bill Nye the Science Guy The Birthday Boys Biz Kids A Black Lady Sketch Show Blue Collar TV Brad Neely's Harg Nallin' Sclopio Peepio Bubble Guppies Bunk The Buster Keaton Show Caesar's Hour Carol Burnett & Company The Carol Burnett Show Cedric the Entertainer Presents Chappelle's Show Check It Out! with Dr. Steve Brule The Chelsea Handler Show Chocolate News The Chris Rock Show The Comedians Comedy Bang! Bang! Cos Crank Yankers The Dana Carvey Show Deon Cole's Black Box Doggy Fizzle Televizzle Don't Look Now The Downer Channel Drew Carey's Improv-A-Ganza Drunk History The Edge The Electric Company (1971)
 The Electric Company (2009)
 The Entertainers The Ernie Kovacs Show The Eric Andre Show Exit 57 Frank TV Fridays Friends of the People Funny or Die Presents The Funny Side Garfunkel and Oates The Garry Moore Show Guys Next Door The Hanna-Barbera Happy Hour Haywire Hee Haw Hell Den Hey Girl Hey Vern, It's Ernest! Hot Fudge House of Buggin' Howie Human Giant Hype I Think You Should Leave with Tim Robinson The Idiot Box The Iliza Shlesinger Sketch Show Important Things with Demetri Martin In Living Color Incredible Crew Inside Amy Schumer The Jacksons Jake and Amir The Jeff Dunham Show Jeffery & Cole Casserole The Jerry Lewis Show The Jonathan Winters Show Just for Laughs Just Say Julie KaBlam! Key & Peele Kroll Show The Lance Krall Show Late Night Like, Share, Die Little Britain USA Live on Tape Loiter Squad The Lyricist Lounge Show Mad Mad Movies with the L.A. Connection Mad TV The Man Show Marie Mary The Mary Tyler Moore Hour Mega64 Michael & Michael Have Issues Mind of Mencia Million Dollar Extreme Presents: World Peace Mostly 4 Millennials Mr. Show with Bob and David The Muppet Show Muppets Tonight Netflix Presents: The Characters The New Show The New Bill Cosby Show The Newz Nick Swardson's Pretend Time No Soap, Radio NonProductive Not Necessarily the News The Not-Too-Late Show with Elmo On the Spot On the Television Onion News Network Out of Control Party Over Here Pink Lady Pirate TV Popzilla Portlandia Pranked Pulp Comics The Red Skelton Show The Rerun Show The Richard Pryor Show Right Now Kapow Robot Chicken Roundhouse Rowan & Martin's Laugh-In The Rundown with Robin Thede Sam and Friends Saturday Morning All Star Hits! Saturday Night Live Saturday Night Live Weekend Update Thursday Saturday Night Special Sesame Street She's Living for This Sherman's Showcase Short Ribbs Skinnamarink TV Six Degrees of Everything The Smothers Brothers Comedy Hour Smosh So Random! Sonny With a Chance Sports Show with Norm Macdonald Stankervision The State Stella Steve Harvey's Big Time Challenge Stevie TV Studio C Super Dave SuperNews! Thank God You're Here That Damn Michael Che Tim and Eric Awesome Show, Great Job! The Tim Conway Show The Tonight Show Toon In with Me Townsend Television Tracey Takes On... The Tracey Ullman Show Tracey Ullman's State of the Union TripTank Trust Us with Your Life Tush TV Funhouse Two More Eggs The Underground Up Late NW Upright Citizens Brigade Uptown Comedy Club USA Up All Night Van Dyke and Company VH1 ILL-ustrated Viva Variety W/ Bob & David The Weird Al Show Welcome Freshman The Whitest Kids U' Know Who Gets the Last Laugh? The Who Was? Show Whose Line Is It Anyway? Wild 'n Out Wonder Showzen You Wrote It, You Watch It Your Show of Shows''

See also
 List of comedy television series
 List of sketch comedy groups

References

Sketch comedy